Lesley Rosemary Turner Bowrey, AM (née Turner; born 16 August 1942) is a retired professional tennis player from Australia. Her career spanned two decades from the late 1950s until the late 1970s. Turner Bowrey won the singles title at the French Championships, one of the four Grand Slam events, in 1963 and 1965. In addition she won 11 Grand Slam events in doubles and mixed doubles. Turner Bowrey achieved her highest singles ranking of No. 2 in 1964.

Career

Bowrey won 13 Grand Slam titles during her career: two in singles, seven in women's doubles, and four in mixed doubles.  She lost in the final of 14 other Grand Slam events.

Bowrey twice won the singles title at the French Championships.  In 1963, she defeated Ann Haydon-Jones in the final, and in 1965, she defeated Margaret Smith in the final.

Bowrey was the runner-up at four Grand Slam singles tournaments.  She lost in the final of the French Championships to Court in 1962 and to Françoise Dürr in 1967.  She lost in the final of the Australian Championships to Court in 1964 and to Nancy Richey in 1967.

She was runner-up at the Italian Championships in 1961, 1963 and 1964 before winning the title in 1967, against Maria Bueno, and 1968, against Margaret Court.

Bowrey captained the Australian Fed Cup team between 1994 and 2000.

Honours and awards

Bowrey was inducted into the Sport Australia Hall of Fame in 1985. She was inducted into the NSW Hall of Champions in 1994. She was inducted into the International Tennis Hall of Fame and received the Sarah Palfrey Danzig Award in 1997. The award is given to the female player who by character, sportsmanship, manners, and spirit of cooperation has contributed to the growth of the game of tennis. In 1998 she was inducted into the Australian Tennis Hall of Fame.

In the Queen's Birthday Honours 2009 Bowrey was appointed as Member of the Order of Australia "for service to tennis as a player, coach and mentor to junior players, and to the community".

She married fellow Australian tennis star Bill Bowrey on 23 February 1968. They are the parents of tennis player Michelle Bowrey.

Grand Slam finals

Singles: 6 (2 titles, 4 runners-up)

Doubles: 12 (7 titles, 5 runners-up)

Mixed doubles: 9 (4 titles, 5 runners-up)

Grand Slam singles tournament timeline

Note: The Australian Open was held twice in 1977, in January and December.  Bowrey participated only in the January edition.

See also 
 Performance timelines for all female tennis players who reached at least one Grand Slam final

References

External links 

 
 
 
 
 

Australian Championships (tennis) champions
Australian female tennis players
French Championships (tennis) champions
International Tennis Hall of Fame inductees
Members of the Order of Australia
People from the Orana (New South Wales)
Sport Australia Hall of Fame inductees
Tennis people from New South Wales
United States National champions (tennis)
Wimbledon champions (pre-Open Era)
1942 births
Living people
Grand Slam (tennis) champions in women's singles
Grand Slam (tennis) champions in women's doubles
Grand Slam (tennis) champions in mixed doubles
Grand Slam (tennis) champions in girls' singles
Australian Championships (tennis) junior champions